Bill Otto is a former Democratic member of the Missouri House of Representatives, representing District 70. He is a Navy veteran and retired air traffic controller. In 2016, Otto choose to run for the 2nd Congressional District seat rather than run for re-election on the state level. He ran a campaign with no primary opposition for the 2nd District Congressional seat and lost to Rep. Ann Wagner. In March 2017, Bill Otto was hired as the Executive Director of the St. Charles County Democratic Central Committee. In February 2018, Otto announced his run for the Missouri House District 65, located in St. Charles County; he lost to incumbent Tom Hannegan by less than two percent in November.

Personal
Otto was born on January 1, 1956. At age 15 his mother died, and he was sent to a boys home. Otto was provided food and shelter until he was 17, when state law forced him to leave.

Otto went on to earn his GED, and attended Meramec Community College and Embry-Riddle Aeronautical University. He was in the United States Navy from 1976 to 1983 and served in VAQ-136 Prowler Squadron at Naval Air Station Whidbey Island.

After his service in the U.S. Navy, Otto worked as an air traffic controller for 31 years. He is a founding member of the National Air Traffic Controllers Association and served as a leader in the St. Louis area and later as president at the national level. Otto retired after 31 years as an air traffic controller.

He and his wife Kathy have been married for over 20 years and raised two sons and three daughters in Bridgeton, Missouri.

Political career
From 1989 to 1995, Otto served on the Bridgeton City Council and worked on numerous candidates' campaigns. In 2012 he was elected to his first term in the Missouri House and was a leader in the efforts to end lobbyist gifts. He accepted zero dollars or gifts in all four of the years he served.

In his 2016 Congressional race against U.S. Rep. Ann Wagner, Otto raised more than $400,000. After a campaign with no primary opposition, Otto lost his bid for the 2nd District Congressional seat to Representative Ann Wagner.

In February 2018, Otto announced his run for Missouri House district 65. In the November general election, he lost to incumbent Republican Tom Hannegan by less than two percent of the vote.

Committee membership
Consumer Affairs
Veterans
Banking
Insurance

References

1956 births
Living people
Democratic Party members of the Missouri House of Representatives
Air traffic controllers
Missouri city council members
United States Navy sailors
21st-century American politicians
Embry–Riddle Aeronautical University alumni